Cash Is King (勝券在握) is a 40-episode drama produced by Hong Kong (aTV) and Singapore (SPH MediaWorks). It was completely filmed in Singapore and aired in 2002. The series title refers to the term "cash is king" and the story centers on how the characters are each affected by stock market crisis, most likely a reference to the financial aftermath of the September 11 attacks.

The series was re-run in 2007, and again in early 2010 on Mediacorp Channel 8.

Synopsis
Is cash really king? The plot revolves around the Qi family, the Tao family and those associated with them. As each of them go through life, they discover in their own way that wealth does not equate true happiness.

Cast

Qi family

Tao family

Other characters

References

Singapore Chinese dramas
2002 Singaporean television series debuts
2002 Singaporean television series endings
2002 Hong Kong television series debuts
2002 Hong Kong television series endings
Singaporean television co-productions
2004 Singaporean television series debuts
2004 Singaporean television series endings
2004 Hong Kong television series debuts
2004 Hong Kong television series endings
Channel U (Singapore) original programming
Asia Television original programming